Salaami is a 1994 Indian Bollywood romantic action film directed by Shahrukh Sultan and produced by Tess Mirza. It stars Ayub Khan, Samyukta Singh in pivotal roles. Film .

Plot
Vijay a cadet of Military Academy falls in love with Sami. Sami's mother Mrs. Kapoor was a victim of a broken love and she is dead against the love affairs of her daughter.

Cast
 Ayub Khan as Vijay 
 Samyukta Singh as Sami
 Roshni Jaffery as Kavita
 Kabir Bedi as Captain
 Saeed Jaffery as Commandant
 Beena Banerjee as Mrs. Kapoor 
 Goga Kapoor as SP Gautam
 Raghvinder Singh Khatri as Brigadier R S Khatri
 Shivpujan Tiwari as Commander

Soundtrack 
The music was composed by Nadeem-Shravan. Singers Asha Bhosle, Pankaj Udhas, Kumar Sanu, Alka Yagnik and Kavita Krishnamurthy rendered their voices in the album. The songs are written by Madan Pal, Sameer, Surendra Sathi and Anwar Sagar.

References

External links
 

1990s Hindi-language films
1994 films
Films scored by Nadeem–Shravan
Indian romantic action films